Lex Brown may refer to:
 Lex Brown (businessman)
 Lex Brown (artist)